The FC Basel 1930–31 season was their thirty eighth season since the club's foundation on 15 November 1893. FC Basel played their home games in the Landhof in the district Wettstein in Kleinbasel. The club's chairman was former player Otto Kuhn for the second successive year.

Overview 
Former player Gustav Putzendopler was appointed as new coach/manager, succeeding Gyula Kertész who had moved on to Hamburger SV. Putzendopler coached the team in a total of 31 matches in their 1930–31 season. 23 of these matches were in the domestic league, 19 in the qualification round and four in the final round. Further, one match was in the Swiss Cup and seven games were friendly matches. Of these seven friendlies three were played at home in the Landhof, one other game was played in Switzerland, two in Germany and one in Mulhouse. Of the friendly games two were won, two were drawn and three ended with a defeat. Of the entire 31 matches, 15 ended with a victory, five with a draw and there were 11 defeats.

The 1930–31 Swiss Serie A was divided into three regional groups, new each group with 11 teams, this due to the larger modification in the league system in the next season. The two teams that ended the group at the top of the table continued to the finals. The top six teams in the table would play the following season in the new Nationalliga, the bottom five teams would play the following season in the new second level named 1 Liga. Basel were allocated to the Central group together with the other local clubs Concordia Basel, Nordstern Basel and Old Boys Basel and newly promoted Black Stars Basel. The other six teams allocated to this group were Young Boys Bern, FC Bern, Aarau, Grenchen and Solothurn and newly promoted FC Luzern.

FC Basel played a good league season, out of the first nine games resulted just one defeat. The games in the new year were somewhat more problematic. In the last game of the season a defeat against Nordstern nearly cost them their place within the top two, because now these two teams were level on points. Basel and Nordstern had to play a barrage and put themselves through to the final by winning two goals to one. Leopold Kielholz was the team's top league goal scorer with 19 goals, he managed a hat-trick in the game against Grenchen on 28 September 1930. Jørgen Juve was second best scorer with 10 goals, he managed a hat-trick in the game against Black Stars Basel on 1 March 1931.

In the preliminary round of the Swiss Cup Basel were drawn at home against FC Locarno and the lost the game after extra time. The game had ended 2–2 after 90 minutes, after 120 minutes the score was 4–4 and so a further 2x 15 minutes were played. The final score was 4–5 and the winning goal was scored in the 150 minute.

A curiosity note to this season is the player Hector Fisher. A tennis player, described as a cosmopolitan "Burmese-Siamese-English-Swiss" athlete. After spending time at Oxford University, he had played tennis there, he moved to Switzerland and played tennis at higher levels. He represented Switzerland during his tennis career and played in the Davis Cup in the years between 1931 and 1939. Fisher also won the Swiss Open in Gstaad four times in 1923, 1928, 1929 and 1931. He played football for Montreux-Sports and played for Basel in this season.

Players 
Squad members

 

Players who left the squad

Results

Legend

Friendly matches

Pre- and mid-season

Winter break and end of season

Serie A

Central Group results

Central Group play-off

Central group table

Final group results

Final group table

Swiss Cup 

Notes

See also 
 History of FC Basel
 List of FC Basel players
 List of FC Basel seasons

References

Sources 
 Rotblau: Jahrbuch Saison 2014/2015. Publisher: FC Basel Marketing AG. 
 Die ersten 125 Jahre. Publisher: Josef Zindel im Friedrich Reinhardt Verlag, Basel. 
 FCB team 1929–30 at fcb-archiv.ch
 Switzerland 1929-30 at RSSSF

External links
 FC Basel official site

FC Basel seasons
Basel